Syncarida is a superorder of crustaceans, comprising the two extant orders Anaspidacea and Bathynellacea, and the extinct order Palaeocaridacea.

Taxonomy
Fifty-nine living genera are known, in six families:
Anaspidacea Calman, 1904
Anaspididae Thomson, 1893
Koonungidae Sayce, 1908
Psammaspididae Schminke, 1974
Stygocarididae Noodt, 1963
Bathynellacea Chappuis, 1915
Bathynellidae Grobben, 1904
Parabathynellidae Noodt, 1965

References

 

 
Arthropod superorders
Taxa named by Alpheus Spring Packard